The Lyricon is an electronic wind instrument, the first wind controller to be constructed.

Invented by Bill Bernardi (and co-engineered by Roger Noble and with the late Lyricon performer Chuck Greenberg), filed for patent on October 5, 1971, by Computone Inc., patented under #US3767833 October 23, 1973 and then manufactured by Computone Inc. in Massachusetts in the early 1970s. The first lyricon was completed in 1974 with Tom Scott being the first customer for the instrument. The Lyricon was available in two designs, the first being somewhat silver and resembling a soprano saxophone and the latter, black and resembling an alto clarinet. Using a form of additive synthesis, the player was allowed to change between types of overtones with a key switchable between fundamentals of G, Bb, C, Eb, and F (allowing the instrument to be used to play transposed parts written for saxophones, trumpets, etc.) and an octave range that could be switched between low, medium, or high. The instrument also had controls for glissando, portamento, and "timbre attack" (a type of chorusing). The Lyricon used a bass clarinet mouthpiece, with a sprung metal sensor on the (non-vibrating) reed that detected lip pressure. Wind pressure was detected by a diaphragm, which moved and changed the light output from an LED, which was in turn sensed by a photocell to give dynamic control. The lyricon I was originally priced at $3,295 which was quite expensive for the time, also probably one of the reasons why the instrument was sold only in small numbers.

Two additional re-modelled Lyricons were engineered later. First the "Wind Synthesizer Driver", which had control voltage outputs for lip pressure, wind pressure and pitch, to control the VCA and VCF and pitch of an external analog synthesizer. Then the "Lyricon II" was engineered, which included a two-oscillator synthesizer. All the Lyricons used the same saxophone style fingering system, with two octave keys above the left-hand thumb rest. The Wind Synthesizer Driver and the Lyricon II also had a transposition footswitch feature, where a foot pedal could be used to transpose the entire range up or down one octave. None of the Lyricons were engineered to use MIDI (which was invented after Computone went out of business in 1980 when Yamaha started to develop their WX7 MIDI wind instrument), although external MIDIfication modules were produced by JL Cooper and STEIM.

Approximately 200 units of the lyricon I were handmade and approximately 2000 units of the driver and Lyricon II were manufactured. However, since Computone went out of Business and due to the death of the instruments' inventor in 2014 the number of functioning instruments reduces more and more as only few people have the know-how to repair them and spare parts are hard to obtain.

The design of the Lyricon controller was later borrowed to form the basis for Yamaha's WX-series MIDI wind controllers.

A prominent example of what a lyricon sounds like can be heard in Michael Jackson's song Billie Jean, where Tom Scott used the instrument.

Prominent lyriconists 

 Ian Anderson
 Jay Beckenstein
 Richard Elliot
 Kenny G
 Chuck Greenberg
 Steve Jolliffe
 Roland Kirk
 Michał Urbaniak
 Yusef Lateef
 Andy Mackay
 Bennie Maupin
 Dan Michaels
 Lenny Pickett
 Jonas Kullhammar
 Courtney Pine
 Raphael Ravenscroft
 David Roach
 Tom Scott
 James Senese
 Wayne Shorter
 Bruno Spoerri
 Pedro Eustache
 John L. Walters
 Charles "Prince Charles" Alexander
 Chris Wood
 Takeshi Itoh

See also
Akai EWI

References

Notes 
 Greenberg, Joy (2006) "A Pause in the Rain" 
 Ingham, Richard (1998) The Cambridge Companion to the Saxophone 
 Search For Expression’ by John L. Walters Sound on Sound magazine, September 1987

External links 

 Demonstration video including very good audio samples
 David O'Brien official Lyricon repair
 Jorrit Dijkstra on the Lyricon
 Article on the Lyricon by Peter Holstlin
 The Lyricon at obsolete.com
 The Wind Controller FAQ
 Lyricon Website by David O'Brien

Electronic musical instruments
Electronic wind instruments